is a Japanese footballer who plays as a midfielder for J2 League club Blaublitz Akita.

Club career
Takuma Mizutani joined to Shimizu S-Pulse in 2014. In June 2016, he moved on loan to FC Imabari.

National team career
In October 2013, Mizutani was elected Japan U-17 national team for 2013 U-17 World Cup. He played 3 matches.

Club statistics
Updated to 12 December 2022.

References

External links
Profile at Shimizu S-Pulse

Profile at FC Imabari

1996 births
Living people
Association football people from Shizuoka Prefecture
Japanese footballers
J1 League players
J2 League players
J3 League players
Japan Football League players
Shimizu S-Pulse players
FC Imabari players
J.League U-22 Selection players
AC Nagano Parceiro players
Blaublitz Akita players
Association football midfielders